Obereopsis lineaticeps is a species of beetle in the family Cerambycidae. It was described by Maurice Pic in 1911.

References

lineaticeps
Beetles described in 1911